Ronald Duxbury Hewat  (22 April 1887 – 15 February 1944) was a South African first-class cricketer and South African Army soldier.

One of eleven children of Andrew Hewat and Elizabeth Usher, he was born at Umtata in April 1887. Hewat served as a corporal in the First World War in the South African Infantry, which formed part of the South African Overseas Expeditionary Force on the Western Front. In July 1918, he gained a temporary officer commission as a  second lieutenant. He was awarded the Military Cross in March 1919 for conspicuous gallantry and devotion to duty which took place from 15–17 October 1918. The 2nd Battalion were tasked with capturing two bridges over the River Selle on the outskirts of Le Cateau and establishing bridgeheads. Commanding a party of men, he succeeded in these objectives and held the positions for two days while under heavy fire until the Allied attack was launched on the 17th. 

Upon his return to South Africa, Hewat made a single appearance in first-class cricket for Griqualand West against Western Province at Cape Town in the 1921–22 Currie Cup. He scored 30 runs in the match and took a single wicket, that of C. H. Thomas. Hewat later served in the South African Army during the Second World War, as a private in the Essential Services Protection Corps. He died on active service in Cape Town in February 1944.

References

External links

1887 births
1944 deaths
People from Mthatha
South African military personnel of World War I
South African Army officers
Recipients of the Military Cross
South African cricketers
Northern Cape cricketers
South African military personnel of World War II
South African military personnel killed in World War II